Durrington-on-Sea railway station is in Goring, a suburb of Worthing in the county of West Sussex. It is  down the line from Brighton. The station is operated by Southern.

It was designed in the Modernist style by the architect to the Southern Railway, James Robb Scott and opened on 4 July 1937. The architecture and design of station has drawn criticism from locals as the "grimmest stop in the South". Owners (Network Rail) and operator (Southern), refute claims of problems and cite lack of central government funding to rebuild stations. Facilities at the station are limited and there are no toilets. There is a waiting room on platform 1, which opened in 2022.

Accessibility 

There is step free access available from the street outside the main entrance to platform 1 (for services to London and Brighton) is available via the side gate. There is a footbridge with steps to platform 2 (services to Littlehampton and Portsmouth). Entrance to the ticket office is by steps from the street, although step-free access is possible via platform 1. In September 2008, the rear entrance direct to platform 2 was adapted for step free access.

Services 
Off-peak, all services at Durrington-on-Sea are operated by Southern using  EMUs.

The typical off-peak service in trains per hour is:

 2 tph to  via 
 1 tph to 
 2 tph to 
 1 tph to 

References

External links 

Buildings and structures in Worthing
Railway stations in West Sussex
DfT Category E stations
Former Southern Railway (UK) stations
Railway stations in Great Britain opened in 1937
Railway stations served by Govia Thameslink Railway
1937 establishments in England
James Robb Scott buildings